Free Life may refer to:

 Free Life (album), a 2007 album by Dan Wilson
 Free Life (balloon), a Rozière balloon that crashed in 1970 while attempting to cross the Atlantic Ocean
 Free Life, a former print journal published by the Libertarian Alliance
 Free Life, a short-lived soul/R&B group from 1978 produced by Philip Bailey of Earth, Wind & Fire
 FreeLife, an American multi-level marketing company that sells nutritional products